Telyachye is a rural locality (a village) in Kadnikov, Sokolsky District, Vologda Oblast, Russia. The population was 12 as of 2002.

Geography 
Telyachye is located 42 km northeast of Sokol (the district's administrative centre) by road. Senino is the nearest rural locality.

References 

Rural localities in Sokolsky District, Vologda Oblast